Paragyalideopsis is a genus of fungi within the family Gomphillaceae. One species is called Paragyalideopsis floridae, and occurs in Florida.

References

Ostropales
Ostropales genera